William Augustus Ayres (April 19, 1867 – February 17, 1952) was a Democratic member of the U.S. House of Representatives from Kansas and a Federal Trade Commissioner.

Early life and career 
William A. Ayres was born in Elizabethtown, Illinois. He moved with his parents to Sedgwick County, Kansas, in 1881. He attended the common schools and Garfield University in Wichita, Kansas. He was admitted to the bar in 1893 and commenced practice in Wichita, Kansas. He was clerk of the Court of Appeals of Kansas from 1897 to 1901, and prosecuting attorney of Sedgwick County, Kansas, from 1906 to 1910.

Political career 
Ayres was elected as a Democrat to the Sixty-fourth, Sixty-fifth, and Sixty-sixth Congresses. He was an unsuccessful candidate for reelection in 1920 to the Sixty-seventh Congress. He was elected to the Sixty-eighth and to the five succeeding Congresses and served until his resignation effective August 22, 1934, having been appointed a member of the Federal Trade Commission on June 30, 1934, in which capacity he served until his death in Washington, D.C., in 1952. He is buried in the Old Mission Cemetery in Wichita, Kansas.

References

The Political Graveyard

1867 births
1952 deaths
People from Elizabethtown, Illinois
Franklin D. Roosevelt administration personnel
Truman administration personnel
Federal Trade Commission personnel
Democratic Party members of the United States House of Representatives from Kansas
Kansas lawyers
20th-century American politicians